Eric Frederic Linder (born October 9, 1978) is an American politician who once served in the California State Assembly.  He is a Republican who represented the 60th Assembly District, encompassing far western Riverside County.  Prior to being elected to the Assembly in 2012, he was a business owner and vice chair of the Riverside County Republican Party.

After being re-elected in 2014, Linder was defeated in his bid for re-election to a third term in 2016 by Democrat Sabrina Cervantes.

In 2018, Linder ran for the Riverside County Board of Supervisors, but was defeated by Corona Mayor Karen Spiegel.

2014 California State Assembly election

2016 California State Assembly election

References

External links 
 
 Campaign website
 Join California Eric Linder

1978 births
Living people
Republican Party members of the California State Assembly
Hispanic and Latino American state legislators in California
Politicians from Corona, California
People from Norco, California
People from Whittier, California
21st-century American politicians
Mexican-American people in California politics